Habib Bank may refer to:
 HBL Pakistan, the oldest commercial bank in Pakistan, founded as "Habib Bank Limited" in 1941
Habib Bank Plaza, headquarters of HBL Pakistan
Habib Bank Limited cricket team
 Habib Bank AG Zurich, originally founded as a branch of HBL in 1967 and independent since HBL's 1974 Nationalization
 Habib Bank Zurich (Pakistan) Pakistani Branch
 Habib Bank Zurich (Hong Kong), Hong Kong subsidiary founded in 1979
 Habib Bank Zurich plc, British subsidiary founded in 2016
 Habib Canadian Bank, Canadian subsidiary founded in 2001
 Habib Metropolitan Bank, Pakistani subsidiary founded in 1992
 HBZ Bank, South African subsidiary founded in 1995
 Bank AL Habib, founded in Pakistan in 1991